The Portuguese Embassy in Washington, D.C. is the diplomatic mission of Portugal to the United States.  The building is located at 2012 Massachusetts Avenue in Northwest, Washington, D.C., in the Embassy Row neighborhood.

Consulates

Portugal maintains a consular presence in the following places:
Boston, Massachusetts (Consulate-General)
Newark, New Jersey (Consulate-General)
New York City, New York (Consulate-General)
San Francisco, California (Consulate-General)
New Bedford, Massachusetts
Providence, Rhode Island
Los Angeles, California
San Diego, California
Miami, Florida
Chicago, Illinois
Houston, Texas
San Juan, Puerto Rico
Phoenix, Arizona
Honolulu, Hawaii
Palm Coast, Florida
New Orleans, Louisiana
Indianapolis, Indiana
Tulare, California
Waterbury-Naugatuck, Connecticut

See also
 List of Washington, D.C. embassies

References

External links

Embassy of Portugal in Washington DC Website
wikimapia

Portugal
Washington, D.C.
Portugal–United States relations
Portugal
Dupont Circle